Kirpili (from Turkic languages: bridge or passage) is a river in Krasnodar Krai in Russia.

The river is used for irrigation. The town of Timashyovsk lies by the Kirpili.

Rivers of Krasnodar Krai